Gowlagh may refer to the following places in the Republic of Ireland:

Gowlagh North
Gowlagh South